Self-Storage is a situation comedy series which aired on BBC Radio 4. The show ran for a two series of six episodes and first aired in September 2007. It starred Reece Shearsmith, Mark Heap and Tom Goodman-Hill, and was written by Tom Collinson and Barnaby Power.

Cast
 Reece Shearsmith as Dave
 Mark Heap as Geoff
 Tom Goodman-Hill as Ron

Plot
Dave (Shearsmith) has seen his marriage break-up and finds himself living in a storage unit called the Storage Garden, where his belongings are also being kept. He is accompanied by fellow self storage inhabitant Geoff (Heap) and security guard Ron (Goodman-Hill).

The second series finds Dave living in the Storage Garden with his sister after her marriage breaks down.

Episodes

Series One

Series Two
Episodes in series two did not use titles. Series Two was written by Tom Collinson.

Media
The second series was made available to purchase on Audible on 29 December 2010.

References

External links

British Comedy Guide
Episode listing from epguides.com

BBC Radio comedy programmes
2007 radio programme debuts
BBC Radio 4 programmes